Joe Bishop (November 27, 1907 – May 12, 1976) was an American jazz multi-instrumentalist and composer.

Early life and education 
Bishop was born in Monticello, Arkansas. He learned piano, trumpet, and tuba when he was young, and also played flugelhorn and mellophone. He attended Hendrix College and played professionally with the Louisiana Ramblers in 1927, including in Mexico.

Career 
Bishop played with Mart Britt, Al Katz, and Austin Wylie before joining Isham Jones's band for five years. He was a founding member of Woody Herman's band in the 1930s, but he contracted tuberculosis in 1940 and had to leave the group. He was rehired by Herman as a staff arranger later in the 1940s, and his arrangements and compositions were recorded frequently by Herman, appearing on some 50 of Herman's albums. As a performer, Bishop played with Cow Cow Davenport and Jimmy Gordon's Vip Vop Band, but retired from studio work due to his health in the 1950s. He quit music and opened a store in Saranac Lake, New York, and later retired to Texas.

Bishop's compositions include "Midnight Blue", "Woodchopper's Ball", and "Blue Prelude" (with Gordon Jenkins), and his work has been covered by musicians as diverse as Ten Years After and Lawrence Welk.

References

External links
 Joe Bishop recordings at the Discography of American Historical Recordings.

1907 births
1974 deaths
American jazz tubists
American male jazz musicians
American jazz pianists
American male pianists
Hendrix College alumni
People from Monticello, Arkansas
People from Saranac Lake, New York
20th-century American pianists
Jazz musicians from New York (state)
Jazz musicians from Arkansas
20th-century American male musicians